Gabrabad (also Romanized as Gabrābād) is a village in Shenetal Rural District, Kuhsar District, Salmas County, West Azerbaijan Province, Iran. At the 2006 census, its population was 400, in 75 families.

References 

Populated places in Salmas County